Newnham is a residential locality in the local government area (LGA) of Launceston in the Launceston LGA region of Tasmania. The 2016 census recorded a population of 6453 for the state suburb of Newnham.
It is a suburb of Launceston. Newnham is located on the East Tamar Highway, on the eastern side of the Tamar River.

The University of Tasmania, Australian Maritime College and TasTAFE have a campus in Newnham. Mowbray Indoor Sport 'n' Skate is also located in this area.

History 
Newnham was gazetted as a locality in 1963.

The suburb was nearly named "Mowbray Heights" in 1961, but this was not gazetted.

Geography
The waters of the Tamar River form the south-western boundary.

Road infrastructure 
Route A8 (East Tamar Highway) runs through from south to north.

References

Suburbs of Launceston, Tasmania
Localities of City of Launceston